Nnamdi Azikiwe was the first President of Nigeria.

Nnamdi Azikiwe may also refer to many things named in his honor:

Nnamdi Azikiwe International Airport, located in Abuja
Nnamdi Azikiwe Stadium, Enugu, Enugu State
Nnamdi Azikiwe University, Awka, Anambra State

Nnamdi Azikiwe